For a list of named planets, dwarf planets and stars, see: List of gravitationally rounded objects in the Solar System
 For a list of named minor planets see: List of named minor planets. 
 For a list of named moons see: List of natural satellites

objects
Named objects